There were two rulers named tin Latin as Boleslaus the Pious:

 Boleslaus II, Duke of Bohemia ( – 7 February 999), Bohemian nobleman, member of the Přemyslid dynasty and the ruling Duke of Bohemia from 972 until his death.
 Bolesław the Pious (1224/27 – 14 April 1279), Duke of Greater Poland during 1239–1247